Lolelia sub-county is a subdivision of Dodoth County in Kaabong District of northern Uganda.

References

Kaabong District